This is a list of foreign ministers of the Soviet Union.

See also 

 Ministry of Foreign Affairs (Russia)
 Ministers of Foreign Affairs of Soviet Russia

.
Soviet
Soviet
Foreign Ministers